The Habanaga is a cultivar of the chili pepper Capsicum chinense. This pepper was developed in New Mexico when a university student unintentionally crossed a Habanero and a Bhut Jolokia.

Culinary use 
Has a heat level of 800,000 Scoville Units.  If the Habanaga is too hot for a dish, a Habanero pepper can be used as a substitute

See also
List of Capsicum cultivars
Capsicum

References

External links
 Habanaga Pepper
 How Hot Are Chile Peppers?

Chili peppers
Capsicum cultivars